Éderson José dos Santos Lourenço da Silva (born 7 July 1999), simply known as Éderson, is a Brazilian professional footballer who plays as a midfielder for  club Atalanta.

Club career

Early career
Born in Campo Grande, Mato Grosso do Sul, Éderson started his professional career at Desportivo Brasil, a club from São Paulo.

Cruzeiro
On 15 July 2018, Éderson was loaned for Cruzeiro, a team playing in the Campeonato Brasileiro Série A, that has the option to sign him after the loan ending in mid-2019. At first, the player should be part of Cruzeiro U20 team, but after training with the first team for some time, Éderson impressed coach Mano Menezes who decided to give him a chance in the first team.

As Cruzeiro was playing three competitions at once, Menezes was forced to use most of the players in the squad in order of rest some important players for some priority competitions. Due to this fact, many young and reserve players had his chance in the first team. On 5 September 2018, Éderson debuted in a 1–1 draw against Botafogo. He came in the match's 75th minute, replacing Thiago Neves.

Despite Cruzeiro disastrous campaign in the 2019 Campeonato Brasileiro Série A (which led the team to be relegated to Série B for the first time in its history), Éderson was one of the best players in the team and was considered by many journalists one of the club's few bright spots in the season.

Corinthians
After Cruzeiro's relegation to Série B, Éderson sued the club for unpaid wages. They reached an agreement allowing him to freely sign with another club. On 20 February 2020, after several days of speculation, Corinthians announced they had signed the athlete for 5 years.

Fortaleza
On 20 February 2021, Éderson was loaned to Fortaleza. He debuted with Fortaleza on 10 March of that same year. In Fortaleza, in 2021, he was one of the main players of the club during the Campeonato Brasileiro of that year, helping the club to qualify to the Copa Libertadores of 2022.

Salernitana
On 30 January 2022, Éderson signed a contract with Salernitana in Italy until 2026.

Atalanta
On 6 July 2022, Éderson joined fellow Serie A club Atalanta.

International career
On 7 October 2018, Éderson was called to play for the Brazil U20 team in two friendly matches against Chile on 13 and 15 October 2018. He played as a starter in the second game, a 2–2 draw.

Honours
Cruzeiro
 Campeonato Mineiro: 2019

Fortaleza
 Campeonato Cearense: 2021

References

External links
Profile at the Atalanta B.C. website
 
 

1999 births
Living people
People from Campo Grande
Sportspeople from Mato Grosso do Sul
Brazilian footballers
Association football midfielders
Desportivo Brasil players
Shandong Taishan F.C. players
Cruzeiro Esporte Clube players
Sport Club Corinthians Paulista players
Fortaleza Esporte Clube players
U.S. Salernitana 1919 players
Atalanta B.C. players
Campeonato Brasileiro Série A players
Serie A players
Brazil youth international footballers
Brazilian expatriate footballers
Brazilian expatriate sportspeople in China
Brazilian expatriate sportspeople in Italy
Expatriate footballers in China
Expatriate footballers in Italy